In algebraic topology, the De Rham–Weil theorem allows computation of sheaf cohomology using an acyclic resolution of the sheaf in question.

Then   

The De Rham–Weil theorem follows from the more general fact that derived functors may be computed using acyclic resolutions instead of simply injective resolutions.

References 

Homological algebra
Sheaf theory